Nam phrik long ruea is a Thailand side-dish, a kind of fried nam phrik (dipping sauce) that is normally eaten with vegetables.

It was supposedly first served in the era of King Rama V (1868–1910) on a boat trip to the Suan Sunanddha palace. The cooks would fry the nam phrik with various left-over ingredients in the kitchen, such as pla duk fu (crispy catfish), sweet pork and vegetables.

History
Suan Sunanddha Palace was the first place to cook the dish. Every royal dish that is served in the palace is said to have originated there. Queen Sadub Ladawan is supposed to have created the recipe for an onboard picnic of two sister princesses – Sohmdet Ying Naawy (สมเด็จหญิงน้อย) and Sohmdet Ying Glaang (สมเด็จหญิงกลาง). This dish was written down by Mawm Luang Neuang Ninrat (หม่อมหลวงเนื่อง นิลรัตน์).

References 

Chili pepper dishes
Dips (food)
Pork dishes
Thai cuisine